Route 351 is a highway on the island of Newfoundland in the Canadian province of Newfoundland and Labrador.  It is one of a small number of provincial routes that start and end on the same highway (in this case, the Trans-Canada Highway) (Route 1).  It is a very short route, running through its only community, Norris Arm.

Major intersections

References

351